Yarlside is a hill in the Howgill Fells, Cumbria (historically Westmorland), England.

This fell is not to be confused with the Yarlside area near Barrow-in-Furness, once served by the Yarlside Iron Mines tramway. Nor should it be confused with Great Yarlside and Little Yarlside on the eastern fringes of the Lake District,  to the northwest.

Peaks of the Yorkshire Dales
Marilyns of England
Hewitts of England
Nuttalls
Ravenstonedale